Helene Karastoyanova (born 1 October 1933 in Sofia) is a Bulgarian composer.

Life
Helene (Elena) Karastoyanova was born in Sofia, Bulgaria, the daughter of composer Assen Karastoyanov. She studied at the State Academy of Music with her father and Alexander Raychev. After completing her studies, she taught music in Sofia at the National Music High School and the Institute for Music and Choreographic Specialists. She served as headmaster of the National Theatre Art High School (State Choreographic School) from 1983-88. Karastoyanov won the March Song Competition prize in 1985, 1987 and 1989.

Works
Karastoyanova composes music mainly for orchestra, chorus and chamber ensemble. Selected works include:

Space Guard (1985) for male choir and symphony orchestra
A Call to Arms (1987) for male choir and symphony orchestra
Suite (1968) for chamber orchestra
Sinfonietta (1969) for string orchestra
Sonata for violin and piano (1967)
Prelude and Joke for flute and piano (1979)
Allegro for trumpet and piano (1980)
Four Pieces (1964) for piano
Children’s Summer, a cycle of five easy pieces (1982) for piano
Holidays (1992) for piano
Three songs for voice and piano (1988)
To Liberty (1974) cantata for mixed choir
Thirst (1974) ballad for mixed choir
Days (1974) for mixed choir
Songs based on traditional lyrics (1977) for mixed choir

She has published professional articles including:
The Hidden Polyphony in the Work of Johann Sebastian Bach
The Phrygian Second in the Bulgarian Folksong

References

1933 births
Living people
20th-century classical composers
Bulgarian music educators
Women classical composers
Bulgarian classical composers
Musicians from Sofia
Women music educators
20th-century women composers